River Axe may refer to:

River Axe (Lyme Bay), an English river flowing south through Axminster to the English Channel in Lyme Bay near Seaton
River Axe (Bristol Channel), an English river flowing west from the Mendip Hills to the Bristol Channel near Weston-super-Mare